Deggingen is a municipality in the district of Göppingen in Baden-Württemberg, Germany.

History
The House of Helfenstein ruled Deggingen until it went extinct in 1627. Deggingen and the town of Reichenbach im Täle were annexed by the Kingdom of Württemberg when, in 1806, the Lordship of Wiesensteig was mediatized to them. That district was reorganized as Landkreis Göppingen, which retained Deggingen and Reichenbach im Täle. The two towns expanded dramatically after World War II, though Reichenbach im Täle's growth tapered off by the end of the 1960s. Reichenbach im Täle was incorporated into Denningen in 1975.

Geography
The municipality (Gemeinde) of Deggingen is found in the district of Göppingen, in Baden-Württemberg, one of the 16 States of the Federal Republic of Germany. Elevation above sea level in the municipal area ranges from a high of  Normalnull (NN) to a low of  NN.

Politics
Deggingen has two boroughs (Ortsteile), Deggingen and Reichenbach im Täle, and five villages: Ave Maria, Berneck, Bierkeller, Gairen, and Nordalb. There are two abandoned villages found in the municipal area: Bogenweiler and Gerenberg.

Coat of arms
The municipal coat of arms of Deggingen displays the head of an elephant, in white, above a yellow, six-pointed star, upon a field of red. The elephant is taken from the coat of arms of the County of Helfenstein, as was the red-yellow tincture, while the six-pointed star has been a symbol of Deggingen since 1551. This coat of arms was approved and a municipal flag issued by the Federal Ministry of the Interior on 30 June 1959.

Transportation
Deggingen lies on the historically important . It was also served by the Tälesbahn railroad between 1903 and 1983.

References

External links

  (in German)

Göppingen (district)